The Mosque of Fier (Albanian: Xhamia e Fierit) is a historic Albanian mosque in the town of Fier, Albania. It is not to be confused with the Ottoman-era mosque in another part of the city.

The Mosque of Fier is one of the largest mosques in Albania and is a visitors' attraction of Fier town. It was built in 2005 after the mass-destruction of houses of worship in Fier under the former Communist ruler Enver Hoxha.

See also
 Islam in Albania

References 

Buildings and structures in Fier
Tourist attractions in Fier
Mosques in Albania
Mosques completed in 2005
2005 establishments in Albania
Mosque buildings with domes